Carita Ann-Marie Jussila (20 August 1947 - 18 March 2011) was a Finnish language teacher and three time World Champion in archery.

Archery

She competed in the women's individual event at the 1980 Summer Olympic Games and finished fourteenth with a score of 2298 points.

Jussila won the World Field Archery Championships and European title in the freestyle women's individual event in 1980, 1982 and 1986. A bronze medal was won in 1988.

Life

Jussila graduated from the University of Helsinki with a Master's degree in Philosophy. She taught Russian and English at the Hyvinkää School of Business until her retirement. Jussila never married or had children.

References

External links 
 Profile on worldarchery.org

1947 births
2011 deaths
Finnish female archers
Olympic archers of Finland
Archers at the 1980 Summer Olympics
World Archery Championships medalists
Finnish women academics
University of Helsinki alumni